WA2 may refer to:

White Album 2, a visual novel in two parts
Wild Arms 2, a role-playing game for the PlayStation